Igor Polygalov (born October 21, 1986) is a Russian professional ice hockey forward who is currently playing for Neftyanik Almetievsk in the Supreme Hockey League (VHL).

Playing career
Polygalov previously joined Traktor Chelyabinsk prior to the 2017–18 season, after spending the previous 9 seasons in the KHL with HC Neftekhimik Nizhnekamsk. While scoring 28 points in 56 games in his first season in Chelyabinsk, Polygalov was signed to a two-year contract extension on February 15, 2018.

On July 16, 2019, Polygalov left Chelyabinsk to sign a one-year contract with his sixth top flight club, HC Dynamo Moscow. In his lone season under contract in 2019–20, he contributed with 8 goals and 14 points in 47 games. With the playoffs cancelled after completion of the first-round due to the COVID-19 pandemic, Polygalov left the club as a free agent.

On 28 June 2020, Polygalov returned for a second tenure with Traktor Chelyabinsk, agreeing to a one-year contract.

References

External links

1986 births
Living people
HC Dynamo Moscow players
HC Neftekhimik Nizhnekamsk players
Severstal Cherepovets players
HC Spartak Moscow players
Traktor Chelyabinsk players
Russian ice hockey centres
Sportspeople from Perm, Russia